The 17005 / 17006 Hyderabad–Raxaul Express is an Express train belonging to South Central Railway zone that runs between  and  in India. It is currently being operated with 17005/17006 train numbers on a weekly basis. The train was cancelled due to closure of Dhanbad – Chandrapura line.
This train is restored on its original route. It will commence its first journey as 17005 Hyderabad Raxaul Express on 4 July 2019 and from Raxaul as 17006 Raxaul Hyderabad Express on 7 July 2019.

Service

The 17005/Hyderabad Deccan–Raxaul Express has an average speed of 50 km/hr and covers 2160 km in 43h 30m. The 17006/Raxaul–Hyderabad Deccan Express has an average speed of 49 km/hr and covers 2160 km in 43h 45m .

Route & Halts 

The important halts of the train are;

Coach composition

The train has standard LHB rakes with a max speed of 130 kmph. The train consists of 22 coaches:

 2 AC II Tier
 4 AC III Tier
 9 Sleeper coaches
 5 General Unreserved
 2 EOG cum Luggage Rake

Traction

Both trains are hauled by a Lallaguda Loco Shed-based WAP-7 electric locomotive from Hyderabad to Raxaul and vice versa.

Rake sharing

The train shares its rake with 17020/17019 Jaipur–Hyderabad Weekly Express.

See also 

 Hyderabad Deccan railway station
 Raxaul Junction railway station
 Dhanbad–Chandrapura line
 Jaipur–Hyderabad Weekly Express

Notes

References

External links 

 17005/Hyderabad Deccan–Raxaul Express India Rail Info
 17006/Raxaul–Hyderabad Deccan Express India Rail Info

Transport in Hyderabad, India
Transport in Raxaul
Defunct trains in India
Rail transport in Telangana
Rail transport in Maharashtra
Rail transport in Chhattisgarh
Rail transport in Jharkhand
Rail transport in Bihar
Railway services introduced in 2011